Tulip is the second studio album by Steel Pole Bath Tub, released in 1990 by Boner Records.

Track listing

Personnel 
Adapted from the Tulip liner notes.

Steel Pole Bath Tub
 Dale Flattum – bass guitar, turntables, effects, vocals
 Mike Morasky – guitar, sampler, vocals
 Darren Morey (as D.K. Mor-X) – drums
Additional musicians
Noah Landis (Noah Pinion) – harmonica (B2)
Paul Reller – saxophone (B5)

Production and additional personnel
Eric Holland – production, engineering
Steel Pole Bath Tub – production
Werkstätte Auf Taos – illustrations

Release history

References

External links 
 

1990 albums
Boner Records albums
Steel Pole Bath Tub albums